RPPN may refer to:

 Reserva Particular do Patrimônio Natural, a type of protected area in Brazil
 RPPN da Unisc, Santa Cruz do Sul University Private Natural Heritage Reserve
 Rastriya Prajatantra Party Nepal
 Rancudo Airfield (IATA code: RPPN), an airport in Kalayaan, Palawan, Philippines